"Canadian Sunrise" is a song recorded by Canadian country music group Prairie Oyster. It was released in 1998 as the first single from their sixth studio album, What Is This Country?. It peaked at number 5 on the RPM Country Tracks chart in December 1998.

Chart performance

Year-end charts

References

Songs about Canada
1998 singles
1998 songs
Prairie Oyster songs
Songs written by Joan Besen
ViK. Recordings singles